Noman Masood (Punjabi, ; born 28 May 1968) is a Pakistani television actor, director and producer. He worked in many PTV dramas, and currently working.

Filmography

Drama serials 
 Shehbaz
 Tujh Pe Qurban
 Neend
 Lagan
 Bandhan
 Meray Khwab Raiza Raiza
 Wardi
 Boond Boond Tanhai
 Kitni Door Kitnay Paas
 Thora Sath Chahiye
 Koonj
 Vanee (Geo TV)
 Band Kidkiyon Kay Peechay
 Aur Phir
 Aadhi Dhoop
 Poore Chaand ki Raat
 Meri Behan Meri Dewrani
 Ullu Baraye Farokht Nahi as Wali  Mohammad
 Inkaar (PTV series) as Prince 
 Adhoora Bandhan as Yasir
 Malangi as Dosu
 Khwab Saraye as Waheed
 Kitni Girhain Baaki Hain as Humayun (Ep:24)
 Zamani Manzil Kay Maskharay
 Teri Meri Kahani as Nawaz
 Khan as Yaqoob
 Baandi as Ali Faizan
 ''Meri Shehzadi as Salahuddin

Telefilms 
 Miyan Biwi Aur Woh (Kashan)
Band Tou Bajega (Jahanzaib) Hum TV

References

External links 
 

Living people
Pakistani male film actors
Pakistani male television actors
Pakistani television directors
Punjabi people
Year of birth missing (living people)